Jinnti is a village in the Karmala taluka of Solapur district in Maharashtra state, India.

Demographics
Covering  and comprising 602 households at the time of the 2011 census of India, Jinnti had a population of 2710. There were 1393 males and 1317 females, with 385 people being aged six or younger.

References

Villages in Karmala taluka